Diving, Safety, Security and Search and Rescue (Turkish:  Dalış Emniyet Güvenlik ve Arama Kurtarma Timleri DEGAK) teams perform underwater missions especially search and rescue operations. They reach depths of up to  underwater. It is a service branch of the Coast Guard Command.   
 
Diving, Safety, Security, Search and Rescue Team is organized into four area commands: the Black Sea, the Sea of Marmara, the Aegean Sea, and the Mediterranean Sea.

Vessel specifications 
The team uses inflatable dinghies to access dive sites:

 Dimensions (Length-Width-Draft): 5.8 M - 2.2 M - 0.75 M

 Vessel: Rubber Inflatable Boat

 Engine Power: 50 HP x2

 Maximum Speed: 30 KTS

See also 

 Coast Guard Command (Turkey)
 Maritime Search and Security Operations Team (Turkey)
 Turkish Navy
 Underwater Offence (Turkish Armed Forces)
 Underwater Defence (Turkish Armed Forces)

References 

Coast Guard Command (Turkey)